Levin is a masculine given name. It is a modern German version of the Old English name Leofwine or the Old German Leobwin or Liebwin, meaning "dear friend."  Dutch variants include Lieven and Lievin. A rare modern English variant is Lewin. It can also be a variant of Levi and is a surname with different origins.

People with the name include:

Levin C. Bailey (c. 1892–1952), judge of the Maryland Court of Appeals
Levin August von Bennigsen (1745–1826), German general in the service of the Russian Empire
Levin Bates (fl. c. 1830s), proprietor of the Levin Bates House
Levin Bufkin (c. 1533–1617), English landowner
Levin Gale (1784–1834), American politician
Levin Goldschmidt (1829–1897), German jurist, judge and academic
Levin H. Campbell (born 1927), United States Circuit Judge
Levin H. Campbell Jr. (1886–1976), U.S. Army lieutenant general
Levin Corbin Handy (c. 1855–1932), American photographer
Levin Irving Handy (1861–1922), American educator, lawyer and politician
Levin Thomas Handy Irving (1828–1892), justice of the Maryland Court of Appeals
Levin Jones (1847–1914), American professional baseball player
Levin Kipnis (1894–1990), Israeli children's author and poet
Levin Major Lewis (1832–1886), Confederate States Army colonel during the American Civil War
Levin R. Marshall (1800–1870), American banker and planter in the Antebellum South
Levin Muller (born 1998), South African cricketer
Levin Öztunalı (born 1996), German professional footballer
Levin M. Powell (1798–1885), U.S. Navy rear admiral
Levin Rauch (1819–1890), Austrian-Hungarian politician
Levin Schücking (1814–1883), German novelist
Levin Ludwig Schücking (1878–1964), German scholar of the English language and English literature
Levin Winder (1757–1819), Revolutionary Army officer in the American Revolutionary War

References

See also
Levin (surname)
Lewin

German masculine given names